Psilocybe azurescens is a species of psychedelic mushroom whose main active compounds are psilocybin and psilocin. It is among the most potent of the tryptamine-bearing mushrooms, containing up to 1.8% psilocybin, 0.5% psilocin, and 0.4% baeocystin by dry weight, averaging to about 1.1% psilocybin and 0.15% psilocin. It belongs to the family Hymenogastraceae in the order Agaricales.

Description 
Gills: The lamellae are ascending, sinuate to adnate, brown, often stained into black where injured, close, with two tiers of lamellulae, mottled, edges whitish.
Spore Print: The spore print is a dark purplish brown to purplish black in mass.
The base of the stipe thickens downwards, is often curved, and is characterized by coarse white aerial tufts of mycelium, often with azure tones. The mycelium surrounding the stipe base is densely rhizomorphic (i.e., root-like), silky white, tenaciously holding the wood-chips together.
Taste: extremely bitter
Odor: odorless to farinaceous

Habitat and distribution 

P. azurescens occurs naturally along a small area of the West Coast of the United States, including in parts of Oregon and California. It has been regularly found as far south as Depoe Bay, Oregon, and as far north as Grays Harbor County, Washington. Its primary locations are clustered around the Columbia River Delta: the first type collections were made in Hammond, Oregon, near Astoria. It is also quite prevalent north of the Columbia River in Washington, from Long Beach north to Westport. Some feral specimens have also been reported in Stuttgart, Germany. While infrequent, the mushroom can sometimes be found around decaying wood in the Willamette Valley of Oregon, which decriminalized psilocybin in 2020. Ilwaco, Washington also has a large population, but harvesting is a potential misdemeanor that is enforced by local law enforcement agencies.

The species' preferred environment ranges from caespitose (growing in tight, separated clusters) to gregarious on deciduous wood-chips and/or in sandy soils rich in lignicolous (woody) debris. The mushroom has an affinity for coastal dune grasses. In aspect it generates an extensive, dense, and tenacious mycelial mat (collyboid). P. azurescens causes the whitening of wood. Fruitings begin in late September and continue until "late December and early January", according to mycologist Paul Stamets. Psilocybe azurescens has been cultivated in many countries including Germany, the Netherlands, New Zealand, the United Kingdom, and its native United States (especially in California, New Mexico, Ohio, Oregon, Washington, Vermont, Wisconsin, and Pennsylvania).

Legal status 

Possession and/or cultivation of this species is illegal in a number of countries, including in the United States under federal law. However, the state of Oregon and the cities of Seattle, Washington; Denver, Colorado; Oakland, California; Santa Cruz, California; and Ann Arbor, Michigan have decriminalized possession of personal amounts of psilocybin mushrooms. It is considered a Class A Drug in New Zealand.

Effects

See also

List of psilocybin mushrooms

References

External links

Psilocybe azurescens on Google Images
Psilocybe azurescens taxonomy paper
Psilocybe azurescens cultivation
Psilocybe azurescens Images

Entheogens
Fungi described in 1995
Psychoactive fungi
azurescens
Psychedelic tryptamine carriers
Fungi of North America